Petronella Barker (born 29 October 1965) is a  British-born Norwegian actress. She was born in Colchester, England, but grew up in Fredrikstad, Norway. While still studying at the Theatre Academy in Oslo (1985–1988), she had her debut in the Soviet-Norwegian co-production Dragens fange (Trees Grow on the Stones Too, 1985). Her breakthrough as a movie actress came with the dystopic Sweetwater (1988), followed by Havet stiger (The Ocean Rises, 1990).

In 1990 she made her stage debut as Perdita in Shakespeare's The Winter's Tale at Centralteatret. Since then she has acted in several plays, also for Oslo Nye Teater and The National Theatre. 

Meanwhile she has continued doing roles both for TV and film, most prominently the movie Thranes metode (Thrane's Method, 1998), and the TV police series Fox Grønland (2001).

Filmography

External links

References

1965 births
Living people
Norwegian film actresses
Norwegian stage actresses
Norwegian television actresses
People from Colchester
People from Fredrikstad
English emigrants to Norway